Jared Ralph Curtis (born 1936) is Professor Emeritus of English at Simon Fraser University.

Curtis received his BA from Yale University in 1957, his MA from the University of Michigan in 1961 and his PhD from Cornell University in 1966. After jobs at Susquehanna University, Indiana University and the University of Arizona, he joined Simon Fraser University as an associate professor in 1971. From 1979 to 1995 he was professor of English at Simon Fraser.

He is internationally known for his work in editing the work and manuscript materials of William Wordsworth and W. B. Yeats: he has supervised the Cornell University Press editions of Wordsworth and Yeats. He is the 2013 recipient of the M. L. Rosenthal Award for distinguished contributions to Yeats studies.

Works
Wordsworth's experiments with tradition; the lyric poems of 1802, with texts of the poems based on early manuscripts, Cornell University Press, 1971. 
(ed.) Poems in two volumes, and other poems, 1800–1807, by William Wordsworth, Cornell University Press, 1983. 
(ed.) The Fenwick Notes of William Wordsworth, Bristol Classical Press, 1993; rev. ed., Humanities Ebooks, 2007. 
(co-ed.) Early Poems and Fragments, 1785–1797, by William Wordsworth, Cornell University Press, 1997. 
(ed.) Last Poems, 1821–1850, by William Wordsworth, Cornell University Press, 1999. 
(ed.) The Land of Heart's Desire:  manuscript materials, by W. B. Yeats, Cornell University Press, 2002. 
(ed.) "Sophocles’ Oedipus at Colonus:  manuscript materials, by W. B. Yeats, Cornell University Press, 2008. 
"The Cornell Wordsworth:  a supplement", Humanities–Ebooks, 2008. 
(co-ed.) "The Resurrection:  manuscript materials", by W. B. Yeats, Cornell University Press, 2011. 
(co-ed.) "On Baile's Strand:  manuscript materials", by W. B. Yeats, Cornell University Press,

References

External links
website

1936 births
Cornell University alumni
Living people
Literary critics of English
Academic staff of Simon Fraser University
American academics of English literature
University of Michigan alumni
Yale University alumni
Indiana University faculty
University of Arizona faculty
Susquehanna University faculty